Switch (stylized as switch)  is a Japanese basketball-themed manga series written and illustrated by Atsushi Namikiri. It was serialized in Shogakukan's Weekly Shōnen Sunday from April 2018 to May 2021, with its chapters collected in fifteen tankōbon volumes.

Publication
Switch, written and illustrated by Atsushi Namikiri, was serialized in Shogakukan's Weekly Shōnen Sunday from April 11, 2018, to May 12, 2021. Shogakukan collected its chapters in fifteen tankōbon volumes, released from November 16, 2018, to July 16, 2021.

Volume list

Reception
Switch was one of the Top 3 Sports Manga Series of the "Nationwide Bookstore Employees' Recommended Comics of 2020" by Honya Club.

References

Further reading

External links
 

Basketball in anime and manga
Shogakukan manga
Shōnen manga